Golam Maula Rony (born ) is a Bangladeshi politician and businessman. He is a former Jatiya Sangsad member from Patuakhali-3 constituency representing Bangladesh Awami League. He joined Bangladesh Nationalist Party in November 2018.

Childhood
Rony was born in a Muslim family in 1967 at Chorvadrashon village in Shadarpur thana in Faridpur. He passed his childhood in his village. His family wasn’t much solvent. In 1974, Ronys family moved to Patuakhali for a better living.

Education
Rony had his primary education in Faridpur. He completed his SSC (secondary School Certificate) in Patuakhali.  After completing HSC (Higher Secondary Certificate) from Dhaka College Rony took admission in Dhaka University and completed graduation at LLB. Rony completed his further education in the same field from Chicago, United States.

Career
Rony started his career with journalism. Later he started his own business. Rony has shipping and textile business. He is the CEO (Chief Executive Officer) of Saybolt Group and also the owner of dnewsbd.com.  In the 9th national parliamentary election Golam Maola Rony was elected to be the MP of Patuakhali-3. In the tenth national parliamentary election of Bangladesh Rony was not given party (Awami League) ticket for Patuakhali-3, because of embarrassing the government by making anti Awami League statement in a TV show.

Books
Golam Maula Rony is the author of four books.
 এমপির কারাদহন.
 গোলাম মাওলা রনির নির্বাচিত কলাম.
 তাসের ঘরে বাঁশের খুটি.
 মোঘল হেরেমের দুনিয়া কাঁপানো প্রেম.

References

Living people
1967 births
Bangladeshi politicians
Bangladeshi male writers
University of Dhaka alumni
9th Jatiya Sangsad members
Place of birth missing (living people)